

49001–49100 

|-id=036
| 49036 Pelion ||  || Pelion, a mountain in Thessaly in central Greece, where the Centaurs were said to live || 
|}

49101–49200 

|-id=109
| 49109 Agnesraab ||  || Agnes Raab (born 1969), Austrian amateur astronomer, long-time member of the Astronomical Society of Linz. The first prediscovery image of this asteroid was found on a plate exposed on her eighth birthday. She is the wife of Herbert Raab, also an amateur astronomer and discoverer of minor planets (Src). || 
|-id=110
| 49110 Květafialová ||  || Květa Fialová (born 1929) is a well-known actress in Czech-Slovak cinematography and theatre, who has been active for almost 70 years || 
|-id=187
| 49187 Zucchini ||  || Roberto Zucchini (born 1958) is an Italian theoretical physicist who teaches theoretical physics and mathematical methods at the Bologna University. His interests reside in the mathematical physics concerning theories of quantum gravity, strings and branes. || 
|}

49201–49300 

|-id=272
| 49272 Bryce Canyon ||  || Bryce Canyon National Park, Utah, home of some of the darkest night skies in the continental United States || 
|-id=291
| 49291 Thechills || 1998 VJ || The Chills are a New Zealand rock band formed in Dunedin in 1980. Images of this asteroid, taken by its discoverer Ian P. Griffin, were shown on the release of the band's new single "Rocket Science/Lost In Space". || 
|}

49301–49400 

|-id=350
| 49350 Katheynix ||  || Kathey Nix (1953–2003), an American amateur astronomer , manager of theaters for the Pink Palace Museum, Memphis, Tennessee, and a founding member of the Society of Low-Energy Observers (SLO). Her enthusiasm and selfless dedication to amateur astronomy and to her many friends will be sorely missed. || 
|-id=382
| 49382 Lynnokamoto ||  || Lynn Okamoto (born 1970) is a Japanese manga artist best known for his manga and anime series Elfen Lied. He resides in Tokyo, Japan. || 
|-id=384
| 49384 Hubertnaudot ||  || Hubert Naudot (1913–1994), a French engineer a pioneer of astronomical calculations using personal computers in the 1980s. He worked for the French Railways (SNCF) and was involved in the creation of the astronomical association of the SNCF. He also taught astronomy to children. || 
|}

49401–49500 

|-id=440
| 49440 Kenzotange ||  || Kenzo Tange (1913–2005), a Japanese architect who designed many public buildings, including the Hiroshima Peace Memorial Museum, the Kagawa Prefectural Office and the Tokyo Metropolitan Government Buildings. || 
|-id=441
| 49441 Scerbanenco ||  || Giorgio Scerbanenco (1911–1969) was a Ukrainian-born Italian writer, best known for his crime and detective novels. He was one of the fathers of the thriller genre in Italy. He wrote The scandal of the astronomical observatory, a thriller which revolves around the discovery of a new asteroid. || 
|-id=443
| 49443 Marcobondi ||  || Marco Bondi (born 1963), an Italian astrophysicist who works at the Istituto Nazionale di Astrofisica in Bologna, where his research activity is mainly focused on radio studies of active galactic nuclei and star-forming galaxies. His multiwavelength surveys are aimed at investigating the properties and cosmological evolution of the sub-millijansky population. || 
|-id=448
| 49448 Macocha ||  || The Macocha Gorge, a very popular visitor site in the Czech Republic. The sinkhole is 168 meters deep and was formed in the early Pleistocene era. It is part of the Moravian Karst, a cave system created by the lost river Punkva. || 
|-id=466
| 49466 Huanglin ||  || Huang Lin (born 1934) is an observational astrophysicist and has made significant contributions to developing the research of stellar physics at Beijing Astronomical Observatory. He shared a First Class National Science and Technology Progress Award for participating in building the first 2-meter class optical telescope in China. || 
|-id=469
| 49469 Emilianomazzoni ||  || Emiliano Mazzoni (born 1953), is an Italian amateur astronomer from Tuscany, expert telescope maker and discoverer of minor planets and supernovae, who founded the Monte Agliale Observatory . || 
|-id=481
| 49481 Gisellarubini ||  || Gisella Rubini (born 1959), girlfriend of the Italian discoverer Matteo Santangelo. She sometimes helps him at the Monte Agliale Observatory . || 
|-id=500
| 49500 Ishitoshi ||  || Toshihiro Ishikawa (born 1975) is a Japanese amateur astronomer and a key member of the Ota Astronomical Club. || 
|}

49501–49600 

|-
| 49501 Basso ||  || Antonella Basso (born 1972), a friend of the Italian discoverer Gianluca Masi. A lawyer by profession, she has a great passion and interest in the arts, particularly in painting and cinema. || 
|}

49601–49700 

|-id=698
| 49698 Váchal ||  || Josef Váchal (1884–1969), a Czech artist whose specific work combined graphic art, wood carving, handmade printing, poetry and writing on the borderline of symbolism, secession and expressionism. His masterpieces include The Bloody Romance and Šumava mountains dying and romantic. || 
|-id=699
| 49699 Hidetakasato ||  || Hidetaka Sato (born 1978), Japanese obstetrician and an amateur astronomer interested in small Solar System bodies. He observes comets and unusual minor planets at the Gunma Astronomical Observatory  and at the Rent-a-Scope observatories. || 
|-id=700
| 49700 Mather ||  || John C. Mather (born 1946), an American cosmologist and senior project scientist for the James Webb Space Telescope. He led the team that constructed the Cosmic Background Explorer (COBE). For his role in mapping microwave radiation and understanding the early Universe he received the 2006 Nobel prize in physics. || 
|}

49701–49800 

|-id=702
| 49702 Koikeda ||  || Chuzo Koikeda (born 1928), a Japanese amateur astronomer, was president of "Kanazawa hoshinokai", an astronomy club in Kanazawa, from 1962 to 2002. His wife Yoko Koikeda (born 1932), also an amateur astronomer, is a serious observer of the Sun, solar eclipses and aurorae. || 
|-id=777
| 49777 Cappi || 1999 XS || Margaret Capitola Sonntag Comba (born 1940), second wife of American amateur astronomer Paul G. Comba, who discovered this minor planet. She is a psychologist and art therapist by profession and a faculty member at Prescott College. || 
|}

49801–49900 

|-bgcolor=#f2f2f2
| colspan=4 align=center | 
|}

49901–50000 

|-id=987
| 49987 Bonata ||  || Diego Bonata (born 1968), an Italian aerospace engineer who has promoted laws for the control of light pollution and energy saving through the Cielobuio Association, of which he is president. At the Carl Sagan Observatory in Brignano Gera d´Adda he has developed new environmentally compatible technologies for lighting engineering. || 
|-id=000
| 50000 Quaoar ||  || Quaoar, a creation deity in Tongva mythology. The Tongva are the indigenous people of the Los Angeles basin. Quaoar has no form or gender and dances and sings Weywot, Sky Father, into existence. Together, they create Chehooit, Earth Mother, and the trio bring Tamit, Grandfather Sun, to life. || 
|}

References 

049001-050000